James J Donnelly known as 'Jimmy' is a retired Irish international lawn bowler.

Bowls career
He represented Northern Ireland at three Commonwealth Games and his best achievement was winning a bronze medal in the pairs at the 1970 British Commonwealth Games in Edinburgh with Syd Thompson.

He won the 1979 pairs title and 1968 fours title at the Irish National Bowls Championships when bowling for the Falls Bowls Club. In addition he has won five National indoor titles and was Ireland's bowler of the year in 1965.

He was the runner-up in the 1979 World Indoor Bowls Championship, losing out to the legendary David Bryant.

Legacy
The 'Jimmy Donnelly Trophy', an award given to Ireland's best bowler at the annual British Isles International series is named after him. He was a mentor to Jim Baker.

Personal life
He was a teacher by trade.

References

Possibly living people
Male lawn bowls players from Northern Ireland
Commonwealth Games bronze medallists for Northern Ireland
Commonwealth Games medallists in lawn bowls
Bowls players at the 1970 British Commonwealth Games
Bowls players at the 1974 British Commonwealth Games
Bowls players at the 1978 Commonwealth Games
1928 births
Medallists at the 1970 British Commonwealth Games